George Washington High School may refer to a number of high schools including:

Washington Preparatory High School (George Washington Preparatory High School), Los Angeles, California
Washington High School (Cedar Rapids, Iowa) in Cedar Rapids, Iowa
George Washington High School (San Francisco) in San Francisco, California
George Washington High School (Colorado) in Denver, Colorado
George Washington High School (Delray Beach) in Delray Beach, Florida
George Washington High School (Guam) in Mangilao, Guam
George Washington High School (Chicago) in Chicago, Illinois
George Washington Community High School in Indianapolis, Indiana
George Washington High School (New York City) in New York City, New York
George Washington High School (Philadelphia) in Philadelphia, Pennsylvania
George Washington High School (Danville, Virginia) in Danville, Virginia
George Washington High School (Charleston, West Virginia) in Charleston, West Virginia

Past schools 
George Washington High School in Alexandria, Virginia, one of the predecessors to today's Alexandria City High School

See also 
Washington High School (disambiguation)
Washington County High School (disambiguation)